"Take My Advice" is a song by American singer Kym Sims, co-written and produced by Steve "Silk" Hurley. It is the follow-up to her successful 1991 debut, "Too Blind to See It", and was released in March 1992 as the second single from her album by the same name (1992). It became a club hit, peaking at number 13 on the UK Singles Chart and number five on the US Billboard Hot Dance Club Songs chart. On the Eurochart Hot 100, it reached number 42. In 2015, Sims released new remixes, as "Take My Advice" (The 2015 Remixes) Part 1 and 2.

Critical reception
Larry Flick from Billboard described the song as a "engaging, pop-flavored houser", noting that a "star-quality vocal performance is inflected with a proper helping of sass and charm". He also added that the influence of producer Steve "Silk" Hurley is prominent, "which should help keep dancefloors filled." Dave Sholin from the Gavin Report felt it "has all those same unique qualities that make Kym's music and sound so special." A reviewer from Music Week commented that "songwise, it tries a little too hard to be poppy, while the production is lacklustre by Hurley's admittedly very high standards. However, it still stands a good chance of crossing over." British Newcastle Evening Chronicle said it is one of the best songs of the album. In an retrospective review, Pop Rescue deemed it the "ideal follow up" to "Too Blind to See It". James Hamilton from the RM Dance Update called it a "catchy, lightweight follow-up". Sylvia Patterson from Smash Hits gave the song three out of five, remarking that "this one's got fantastically weedy rap bits in it", adding that "this will be another gigantic merry house winner."

Track listings

Charts

Sampling
German DJ/artist Marusha used samples from "Take My Advice" in her track "Go Ahead".

References

1992 singles
1992 songs
American house music songs
East West Records singles
Electro songs
Electronic songs
House music songs
Songs written by Steve "Silk" Hurley